Stephen Michael McCarthy (born July 21, 1988 in Honolulu, Hawaii) is a former American soccer player who previously played for San Antonio FC.

Career

Youth and college
McCarthy played youth soccer with the Dallas Texans 88'. Former teammates include Andre Akpan, Ross LaBauex, Jonathan Villanueva and Omar Gonzalez. This team also won three National Championships along with being the only American team to win the Dallas Cup Super Group. During that year both Manchester United and Real Madrid took part in the international tournament.

McCarthy attended Nolan Catholic High School in Fort Worth, Texas. During his senior year along with leading Nolan Catholic to a State Championship, he was also awarded the Texas Association of Private and Parochial Schools Division I Offensive Player of the Year. As well as being recognized as an All-State selection (2006).

McCarthy played college soccer at Santa Clara University, and later transferred to the University of North Carolina at Chapel Hill. He also played USL Premier Development League for the DFW Tornados and then the Carolina Dynamo in the following year.

Professional
McCarthy was drafted in the second round (24th overall) of the 2011 MLS SuperDraft by New England Revolution. He made his professional debut on March 20, 2011, in the Revs' first game of the 2011 MLS season against Los Angeles Galaxy, and scored his first professional goal on April 2 in a 1–1 tie with the Portland Timbers.

International
McCarthy represented the U.S. at the Under-20 level. In 2007, he played for the U.S. Under-18's at the Pan-American Games held in Rio de Janeiro, Brazil.

References

External links
 UNC profile
 

1988 births
Living people
American soccer players
American expatriate soccer players
Santa Clara Broncos men's soccer players
North Carolina Tar Heels men's soccer players
DFW Tornados players
North Carolina Fusion U23 players
New England Revolution players
Kuopion Palloseura players
San Antonio FC players
Association football defenders
Soccer players from Hawaii
Soccer players from Texas
Footballers at the 2007 Pan American Games
New England Revolution draft picks
USL League Two players
Major League Soccer players
Veikkausliiga players
USL Championship players
United States men's youth international soccer players
Expatriate footballers in Finland
Sportspeople from Fort Worth, Texas
American expatriate sportspeople in Finland
Incarnate Word Cardinals men's soccer coaches
Pan American Games competitors for the United States